Dahinsara Junction railway station is a  railway station on the Western Railway network in the state of Gujarat, India. Dahinsara Junction railway station is 27 km from Morbi railway station. Passenger trains halt here. Navlakhi Port is well connected to Dahinsara Junction by rail.

See also
 Morbi district

References

Railway stations in Morbi district
Rajkot railway division
Railway junction stations in Gujarat